Weixi Township is a rural township in Chengbu Miao Autonomous County, Hunan, China. It borders Dengyuantai Town of Wugang in the north, Malin Township of Xinning County in the east, and Xiyan Town in the south and west.

Name
The name of the township is named after the Weixi River.

Administrative division
As of 2015, the township is divided into 10 villages: Anfu, Zhengchong, Xinglong, Fuxing, Chashan, Baisha, Jingping, Yinsha, Changtian and Xuehua.

Geography
The township is located in the north of Chengbu Miao Autonomous County.

There are 462 streams and creeks in the township, including Weixi River.

Weixi Reservoir is the largest body of water in the township.

Demographics
In December 2015, the township had an estimated population of 8,780 and a population density of 126 persons per km2. Miao people is the dominant ethnic group in the township, accounting for 4,533, accounting for 51.63%. There are also 8 ethnic groups, such as Dong, Hui, and Yao. Among them, there are 1,712 Han people (19.50%) and 1,632 Dong, Hui and Yao people (18.59%).

Economy
The region abounds with copper, manganese, tungsten, antimony and silicon.

Plant resources
Phyllostachys edulis and cathaya are the main plant resources. In October 1990, the Hunan Provincial Government bestowed on it the title of "hometown of phyllostachys edulis".

References

Chengbu Miao Autonomous County